The Spirit Of Boom Classic is a Brisbane Racing Club Group 2 Thoroughbred horse race for horses aged two years old, at set weights, over a distance of 1200 metres at Doomben Racecourse, Brisbane, Australia during the Queensland Winter Racing Carnival. Total prizemoney is A$250,000.

History

The two-year-old event is the first major race during the Brisbane winter racing carnival.

The race record was set by Gold Edition in 2006 in time of 1:09.36.

Name
1982–1983 - Coca-Cola Stakes    
1984–1994 - Coca-Cola Bottlers' Classic
1995–1998 - Coca-Cola Classic
1999–2001 - Moet and Chandon Classic
2002–2020 - Champagne Classic
2021 onwards - Spirit Of Boom Classic

Grade
1982–1986 -  Listed Race
1987–2005 -  Group 3
2006 onwards - Group 2

Venue
2013 - Eagle Farm Racecourse
2020 - Eagle Farm Racecourse
2022 - Eagle Farm Racecourse

Winners

 2022 - Swiss Exile
 2021 - Prince Of Boom
 2020 - Rothfire
 2019 - Dubious
 2018 - Zousain
 2017 - Tangled
 2016 - Winning Rupert
 2015 - Blueberry Hill
 2014 - Brazen Beau
 2013 - Vo Heart
 2012 - Sizzling
 2011 - Free Wheeling
 2010 - Pressday
 2009 - Funtantes
 2008 - Court
 2007 - Keiki
 2006 - Gold Edition
 2005 - Virage de Fortune
 2004 - Golden Fox
 2003 - Shamekha
 2002 - Lovely Jubly
 2001 - Dolce Veloce
 2000 - Chenar
 1999 - Alpine Express
 1998 - Electrifying
 1997 - Staging
 1996 - Flavour
 1995 - Ginzano
 1994 - Chief De Beers
 1993 - Sardana
 1992 - Surtee
 1991 - Bold Promise
 1990 - Our Horizon
 1989 - Gin Rhythm
 1988 - race not held
 1987 - Prince Anton
 1986 - Breakfast Creek
 1985 - Swiftly Roman
 1984 - Pete's Choice
1983 - Daybreak Lover
1982 - Peand

See also
 List of Australian Group races
 Group races

References

Horse races in Australia
Flat horse races for two-year-olds